Qiyan jueju (七言絕句; abbr. qijue 七絕), known in Japan as  is a type of jueju poetry form  consisting of four phrases each seven Chinese characters (or kanji) in length.

Shichigon-zekku are the most common form of classical Chinese poems (kanshi), and the standard form of shigin (Japanese chanted poetry).

Composition
In composing Qiyan Jueju, the character of the phrases (Jueju) is important.  The rules are as follows:

First phrase : Depiction of the scene
Second phrase : Add further illustration and detail to the Qiju
Third phrase : By changing the scene of action, reveal the true essence of the poem
Fourth phrase : In assimilating the Zhuanju draw together and complete the poem

Examples
 Example of qiyan jueju:

 Example of shichigon-zekku:

See also
Chinese poetry
Jueju
Kishōtenketsu
Shigin
Japanese poetry

External links
Background to Mount Fuji poem (Japanese)
Explanation of Shichigon-zekku form and history (Japanese)

Poetic forms
Japanese poetic forms
Japanese literary terminology
Stanzaic form
Chinese poetry forms
Articles containing Japanese poems